Loreto Municipality may refer to:
 Loreto Municipality, Bolivia
 Loreto Municipality, Baja California Sur, Mexico
 Loreto Municipality, Zacatecas, Mexico

Municipality name disambiguation pages